Dramaine Coulibaly (born 18 March 1979) is a Malian retired professional footballer who played as a striker. He spent his entire professional career in France except for a stint in Indonesia. He also holds a French passport.

International goals
Scores and results list Mali's goal tally first, score column indicates score after each Coulibaly goal.

External links
 
 

1979 births
Living people
Sportspeople from Bamako
Malian footballers
Association football forwards
Mali international footballers
Mali under-20 international footballers
2002 African Cup of Nations players
Ligue 1 players
Ligue 2 players
Liga 1 (Indonesia) players
Olympique de Marseille players
Stade Lavallois players
Nîmes Olympique players
FC Gueugnon players
Tours FC players
Pelita Bandung Raya players
JS Centre Salif Keita players
Malian expatriate footballers
Malian expatriate sportspeople in France
Expatriate footballers in France
Malian expatriate sportspeople in Indonesia
Expatriate footballers in Indonesia
21st-century Malian people